Tashanta (Tojoñtı) is a rural locality (a selo) and the administrative centre of Tashantinskoye Rural Settlement of Kosh-Agachsky District, the Altai Republic, Russia. The population was 547 as of 2016. There are 13 streets.

Geography 
Tashanta is located on the bank of the river Tashantinki near the Russian border with Mongolia, 51 km southeast of Kosh-Agach (the district's administrative centre) by road. Zhana-Aul is the nearest rural locality.

References 

Rural localities in Kosh-Agachsky District